Electoral results for the district of Paddington may refer to:

 Paddington (UK Parliament constituency)#Elections
Electoral results for the district of Paddington (New South Wales)
 Electoral results for the district of Paddington (Queensland)
Electoral results for the district of Paddington-Waverley